The Tocache Province  is one of 10 provinces of the San Martín Region in northern Peru.

History 
Tocache Province was created by Law Dec 6, 1984, in Fernando Belaúnde's term.

Boundaries
North: Mariscal Cáceres Province
East: Bellavista Province
South: Huánuco Region
West: Ancash Region

Political division
The province is divided into five districts.
 Nuevo Progreso (Nuevo Progreso)
 Pólvora (Pólvora)
 Shunte (Tambo de Paja)
 Tocache (Tocache)
 Uchiza (Uchiza)

Mayors 
 2011-2014: Corina De La Cruz Yupanqui, Despertar Nacional.
 2007-2010: David Bazán Arévalo, Movimiento Regional Nueva Amazonía.
 2003-2006: Pedro Bogarin Vargas, Lista Independiente.
 1999-2002: Tadeo Rengifo Arévalo, Acción Popular.

References 

Provinces of the San Martín Region